, a Gato-class submarine, was the first ship of the United States Navy to be named for the bluefish. Between 9 September 1943 and 29 July 1945 she completed nine war patrols. Her operating area extended from the Netherlands East Indies to the waters south of Honshū. According to the notoriously unreliable JANAC accounting, Bluefish sank 12 Japanese ships totaling 50,839 tons.

Construction and training
Bluefish was laid down 5 June 1942 by Electric Boat Co., Groton, CT. She was launched 21 February 1943 (sponsored by Mrs. Robert Y. Menzie), and commissioned 24 May 1943. Bluefish departed New London 21 July and reported to Task Force 72 (TF 72) at Brisbane, Australia on 21 August 1943.

On 8 September 1943, a Royal Australian Air Force Catalina flying boat mistakenly strafed Bluefish in the Timor Sea north of Melville Island.

First war patrol
Bluefish departed Brisbane on 9 September 1943 to patrol the South China Sea for 25 days. On 25 September Bluefish torpedoed the Japanese merchantman Akashi Maru (3228 GRT) south-east of Celebes, Netherlands East Indies, in the Flores Sea. On 29 September Bluefish found and sank the damaged Akashi Maru north of Wetar.

Second war patrol
Bluefish departed Fremantle in October 1943 for a 32-day patrol of the South China Sea. On 8 November Bluefish torpedoed and sank the Japanese tanker Kyokuei Maru (10570 GRT) in the South China Sea.

Third war patrol
Bluefish departed Fremantle in December 1943 for a 27-day patrol of the South China Sea. On 30 December, she sank the Japanese oiler Ichiyu Maru (5061 GRT) in the Java Sea. After laying mines off the eastern Malayan coast on 3 January 1944, Bluefish attacked a Japanese convoy off Indo-China together with Rasher. Bluefish torpedoed and sank the Japanese tanker Hakko Maru (6046 GRT) on 4 January.

Fourth war patrol

Fifth war patrol
Bluefish departed Fremantle in May 1944 for a 53-day patrol of the Celebes Sea. On 16 June, she sank the Japanese merchant Nanshin Maru (1422 GRT) in the Celebes Sea south-west of Tarakan, Borneo. On 21 June, she sank the Japanese transport Kanan Maru (3280 GRT) off the southern approaches to Makassar Strait.

Sixth war patrol
Bluefish departed Fremantle in July 1944 for a 54-day patrol to Pearl Harbor.

Seventh war patrol
Bluefish departed Pearl Harbor in February 1945 for an unproductive 42-day patrol of Japanese coastal waters.

Eighth war patrol
Bluefish departed Pearl Harbor in April 1945 under the command of George W. Forbes for an unproductive 38-day patrol to Fremantle.

Ninth war patrol
Bluefish departed Fremantle in June 1945 for a 33-day patrol of the South China Sea.

Post-war operations
With the cessation of hostilities, Bluefish returned to the United States, arriving at Philadelphia Navy Yard 9 October 1945. She was placed in the 16th Fleet and on 31 October moved to the Submarine Base, New London. She was later towed to Electric Boat Co., Groton, where she underwent repairs. On 12 June 1946 she returned to New London where she went out of commission in reserve 12 February 1947.

Bluefish was recommissioned 7 January 1952 at the Submarine Base, New London, and reported to Submarine Division 82, Atlantic Fleet. On 7 April she proceeded to Key West, Florida, and reported to Submarine Division 41 on 11 April. She operated along the Florida coast and in the Caribbean, engaging in local operations and training exercises until May 1953.

On 7 June 1953 Bluefish arrived at the Portsmouth Naval Shipyard in Kittery, Maine. Following pre-inactivation overhaul at the shipyard, she was placed out of commission in reserve at New London 20 November 1953.

Honors and awards
  Asiatic-Pacific Campaign Medal with 10 battle stars for World War II service

References

Citations

Bibliography
 
 Hinman, Charles R., and Douglas E. Campbell. The Submarine Has No Friends: Friendly Fire Incidents Involving U.S. Submarines During World War II. Syneca Research Group, Inc., 2019. .

External links 
hazegray.org: USS Bluefish
navsource.org: USS Bluefish
 Kill record: USS Bluefish
ussbluefish.com: USS Bluefish (SS-222) History

Gato-class submarines
World War II submarines of the United States
Cold War submarines of the United States
Ships built in Groton, Connecticut
1943 ships
Maritime incidents in September 1943
Friendly fire incidents of World War II